András Kuttik (23 May 1896 – 2 January 1970) was a Hungarian football player and manager. Born in Budapest, Kuttik is famous for his connections to Italian football where he played for three clubs, before going on to manage many more.

Kuttik was typical of a journeyman footballer, though he did build up a strong connection to Bari where he managed during different spells.

References

1896 births
1970 deaths
Footballers from Budapest
Hungarian footballers
Association football midfielders
Modena F.C. players
Aurora Pro Patria 1919 players
A.C. Legnano players
Hungarian football managers
Hellas Verona F.C. managers
Cagliari Calcio managers
Reggina 1914 managers
S.S.C. Bari managers
L.R. Vicenza managers
Torino F.C. managers
S.S.D. Lucchese 1905 managers
Cosenza Calcio managers
Beşiktaş J.K. managers
Göztepe S.K. managers
Serie A managers
Serie B managers
Süper Lig managers
Hungarian expatriate football managers
Hungarian expatriate sportspeople in Italy
Expatriate football managers in Italy
Hungarian expatriate sportspeople in Turkey
Expatriate football managers in Turkey